The following is a simplified family tree of the English, Scottish, and British monarchs. For a more detailed chart see: Family tree of English monarchs (from Alfred the Great through Queen Elizabeth I); Family tree of Scottish monarchs (from Kenneth MacAlpin through James VI and I); Family tree of Welsh monarchs; and the Family tree of the British royal family for the period from Elizabeth I's successor, James VI and I, until the present day. For kings before Alfred, see House of Wessex family tree.

List of monarchs

See also
 Family tree of English monarchs (more detailed)
 Family tree of the British royal family (more detailed)
 Lists of monarchs in the British Isles

References
 
 
 

British
English monarchs
Dynasty genealogy